

Relay
The weather conditions were generally clear and cold. The wind was light.
The relative humidity was 22%, the air temperature was -20 °C, and the
snow temperature was -20 °C.

Sprint
There were 36 entries in the Competition. Three did not finish and one was disqualified.
The weather conditions were generally Cold. The wind was gusty. The
relative humidity was 22%, the air temperature was -20 °C, and the
snow temperature was -20 °C.

Individual
The weather conditions were generally cold. The wind was gusting.
The relative humidity was 22%, the air temperature was -20 °C, and the
snow temperature was -20 °C.

Pursuit
12.5 km men's and 10km women's pursuit were cancelled due to weather.

2007 Canada Winter Games